Camp Branch is a  long 1st order tributary to the Rocky River, in Anson County, North Carolina.

Course
Camp Branch rises on the divide between Camp Branch and Bowsaw Branch about 0.5 miles northwest of Cedar Hill in Anson County, North Carolina.  Camp Branch then flows east to meet Rocky River about 1.5 miles north of Cedar Hill.

Watershed
Camp Branch drains  of area, receives about 47.8 in/year of precipitation, has a topographic wetness index of 418.40 and is about 48% forested.

References

Rivers of North Carolina
Rivers of Anson County, North Carolina